Saint Jerome's Academy (SJA) is a private, Roman Catholic parochial school in Bagabag, Nueva Vizcaya, Philippines, named after the patron saint of the town, St. Jerome. It offers education from kindergarten to high school. Founded by the Congregation of the Immaculate Heart of Mary (Congregatio Immaculati Cordis Mariae, CICM) missionaries in 1954 and run by the Diocese of Bayombong.

Catholic elementary schools in the Philippines
Catholic secondary schools in the Philippines
Schools in Nueva Vizcaya
Educational institutions established in 1954
1954 establishments in the Philippines